Paris By Night 16 is a Paris By Night program produced by Thúy Nga that was filmed in Paris. The MC's were Khánh Ly, Hương Lan & Elvis Phương. This show was released on VHS in 1992. 

Trivia: The three MC's took turns throughout the show interviewing every singer after each performance: Khánh Ly took most of the MC position in tape two after her own performance at the end of tape one. Hương Lan & Elvis Phương were the other two main MCs who MC'd in tape one. This was another Paris By Night show that had no specific title, along with Paris By Night's 1-12, 14-18, Paris By Night 25, Paris By Night 31 & Paris By Night 50. In this show, Dalena showed off her bilingual singing skills during her interview, accompanied by a guitarist. She also got a second interview in which she got a bit emotional from Elvis Phương's translation of her words to her fans. In addition, Mr. Lê Bá Chư, owner of Giáng Ngọc Music, presented Mrs. Thúy Nga with a golden record and a trophy. After Trường Thanh's performance, Khánh Ly interviewed Ms. Hạnh Phước about Hạnh Phước's Cosmetic Surgery for the first time.

Track list

Tape 1

01. Liên Khúc Yêu:
 Bên Nhau Ngày Vui (Quốc Dũng)
 Yêu Em Dài Lâu (Đức Huy)
 Và Tôi Cũng Yêu Em (Đức Huy)
 Biết Đến Thuở Nào (Tùng Giang)
- Bảo Hân & Thái Tài

02. Cỏ Ủa (Lam Phương) - Dalena

03. Người Tình Trăm Năm (Đức Huy) - Don Hồ

04. Biết Đến Bao Giờ (Lam Phương) - Phượng Mai

05. Phút Cuối (Lam Phương) - Anh Khoa

06. Gọi Tên Bốn Mùa (Trịnh Công Sơn) - Khánh Ly

Tape 2

07. Tình Đầu (Hoàng Trọng) - Trường Thanh

08. Prisoner (Alan Nguyễn) - Ngọc Huệ

09. Đêm Đông (Nguyễn Văn Thương) - Bạch Yến

10. Liên Khúc Đến Bên Anh
 Hãy Đến Bên Chàng (Ngọc Trọng)
 Đỗ Quỳnh Hương (Đức Huy)
 Hoang Vu (Đức Huy)
 Nếu Một Mai Em Sẽ Qua Đời (Phạm Duy)
- Như Mai & Duy Tường

11. Chiều Cuối Tuần (Trúc Phương) - Phương Hồng Quế

12. Liên Khúc Định Mệnh:
 Lời Cuố Cho Người Tình (Nguyên Vũ)
 Mảnh Tình Thương (Mạnh Giác)
 Định Mệnh (Song Ngọc).
- Elvis Phương & Dalena

13. Duyên Tình (Xuân Tiên) - Hương Lan

14. Hạnh Phúc Trong Tim - Ngọc Huệ & Don Hồ

Paris by Night